Sanjay Kalra (born 18 April 1970) is an Indian endocrinologist working at Bharti Hospital, Karnal, Haryana.  Kalra is the Immediate Past President of Endocrine Society of India and Vice President of South Asian Federation of Endocrine Societies. He also serves on the executive council of the Research Society for Study of Diabetes in India. He has over 1000 PubMed indexed articles to his name, and has fostered bilateral and multilateral links between various Afro Asian countries in the field of endocrinology. He has developed the terms Glucocrinology and Lipocrinology. and  the Gluco Coper tool to assess coping mechanisms. Winner of the DAWN Award (2009). He has also published the concepts of diabetes fatigue syndrome, euthymia in diabetes, quaternary prevention in endocrinology, and quinary prevention.

Education
Kalra is a graduate of Christian Medical College, Ludhiana. he completed his post-graduation (MD) in Medicine at Pandit Bhagwat Dayal Sharma Post Graduate Institute of Medical Sciences, Rohtak, and fellowship (DM) in Endocrinology and Metabolism at All India Institutes of Medical Sciences, New Delhi.

Professional contribution 
Kalra has established Bharti Hospital, Karnal, which provides clinical care, research, training, and education in endocrinology. As executive editor (2011–15), he worked to establish the Indian Journal of Endocrinology and Metabolism (IJEM) as India's second-best scientific journal (Google Metrix). He also serves as an executive editor, Thyroid Research and Practice, and associate editor, Diabetic Medicine Editor, Diabetic Medicine (UK). He works as an international advisory member for various journals, including US Endocrinology, Sri Lankan Journal of Diabetes Endocrinology and Metabolism (SLJDEM), Journal of Pakistan Medical Association, and Journal of Diabetes Endocrinology Association of Nepal (JDEAN).

As a founder member and vice president, Kalra has contributed to setting up and strengthening the South Asian Federation of Endocrine Societies (SAFES). This contribution has been acknowledged by neighbouring countries, and he has been awarded Fellowship and life membership of Sri Lanka College of Endocrinologists (SLCE), as well as life membership of Pakistan Endocrine Society (PES).

References  

1970 births
Living people
Indian endocrinologists
People from Karnal
Indian diabetologists
Haryana
Indian expatriates in Nigeria
20th-century Indian medical doctors
21st-century Indian medical doctors